papaya CMS is an open-source content management system, free of charge and complying with open standards like XML as data format, XSLT as templating language, and PHP for programming.

History 
Development started in 2000 as a commercial project, papaya CMS was then released as an open-source CMS under the GNU General Public License in 2005. Its architecture and feature set are derived from the initial use case in commercial/larger installations.

System architecture 
papaya CMS is a software build upon a modular concept, to use it as framework for special applications beside the typical tasks of a content management system. It fully supports unicode, multi-language and multi-site installations.

All texts, configuration data etc. is stored as XML in a relational database. Media files such as images and videos are located in the file system and will be managed by papaya and referenced as needed.

Many functions (such as database access, authentication, build methods for backend menus, etc.) are defined centrally and can be accessed through an abstraction layer.

papaya CMS is developed in PHP and object-oriented. Data is stored in XML, XSLT is used as template language. The system does not use self-developed or proprietary script- or templating languages.

Special features 
Unlike many other CMS papaya CMS is characterized by the fact that it is available under the GPL on the one side. On the other side, a company behind the product is available that provides support and training.

Accessibility 

With its clear separation of content, layout and formatting using XSLT, anything possible in XHTML/HTML can be implemented in papaya CMS - this is in the hands of the developer. So papaya is an option for accessibility.

Features and functions

Base system 
 based on open technologies (PHP/XSLT/XML, MySQL and PostgreSQL)
 compatible with MySQL, PostgreSQL, SQLite
 strict separation of layout and logic by XSLT templates
 accessible pages no problem
 optimized for search engines
 intelligent caching system for pages and sub-content
 automatic scaling of images, flash files etc.
 picture browser for easy viewing
 WYSIWYG editor
 separate user management for page authors and visitors
 work-flow mapping
 easily expandable with PHP classes
 versioning / staging
 automatic generation of sitemaps
 integrated messaging system
 creation of aliases ("short URLs")
 cronjobs to automate tasks
 logging of user actions and system messages
 Translation module for the backend to add more languages
 synchronous multi-language features for content and article types (each item can be present in as many languages as wanted)
 100% unicode support
 Output filters (to output items as HTML and as an alternative as PDF or others)
 central task overview ("papaya Today"), in which all tasks, messages and unpublished articles, etc. are displayed
 Multi-Site features (Delivery of different webpage contents with customizable domain options (output formats, templates, designs, etc.) per domain / virtual host)
 multi-layered caching of page output (for XML-output of page modules, output of boxes, full pages and support for memcached servers and xslcache)
 operating on multiple servers (webcluster) or based on cloud computing infrastructure possible
 support for various database servers that are operated in a master-slave network or cluster. Separation of the databases for exclusive write access and other databases for read-only access is possible via the backend.

free GPL plugins 

 Community
 Blog
 Geo maps (to embed Google Maps, Yahoo Maps or OpenStreetMap)
 Asset Management / Media-database for images, videos and flash files Bilder, includes image editing and versioning
 Catalog module for virtual navigation structures (Navigation can be generated independently from the actual position of the article in the page tree, articles can thus be used identically in several places too)
 Rating / feedback opportunity for pages
 Quiz
 Dynamic creation of diagrams
 Recommend pages
 Comment pages
 Topics subscriptions (Users can subscribe to notifications about changes to the content)
 FAQ system
 Forums
 Link database
 Event calendar
 Multi-page article

See also

Content management
Content management system
List of content management systems

References

External links

Official website 

Free content management systems
Free software programmed in PHP